António Mota (born 16 July 1957) is a Portuguese writer, known for his works of literature for children and young people.

Biography
Mota was born on July 16, 1957, in Baião, Porto District. He wrote his first book, "A Aldeia das Flores" in 1979, and published dozens of works. Some of his books are published in Brazil and translated into Castilian, Galician and Serbian.

Bibliography
 A Aldeia das Flores, 1979
 As Andanças do Senhor Fortes, 1980
 Pardinhas, 1989
 Cortei as Tranças, 1990
 Pedro Alecrim, 1990    
 A casa das bengalas, 1995
 David e Golias, 1995
 Sal, sapo, sardinha, 1996
 Segredos, 1996
 Os Heróis do 6º F, 1996
 Sonhos De Natal, 1997
 O agosto que nunca esqueci, 1998
 Fora de serviço, 1999
 O príncipe com cabeça de cavalo, 1999
 O velho e os pássaros, 2000
 A galinha medrosa, 2000
 Romeu e as rosas de gelo, 2000
 O livro das adivinhas, 2001
 O livro dos provérbios, 2001
 O nabo gigante, 2001
 Onde tudo aconteceu, 2002
 A galinha medrosa, 2002
 O galo da velha Luciana, 2002
 Pedro malasartes, 2002
 Abada de histórias, 2002
 A gaita maravilhosa, 2002
 O sapateiro e os anões, 2003
 Romeu e as rosas de gelo, 2003
 A princesa e a serpente, 2003
 Filhos de Montepó, 2003
 Maria pandorca, 2004
 O Sonho De Mariana, 2003
 O velho e os pássaros, 2004
 Uma tarde no circo, 2004
 O livro das adivinhas -2º volume, 2005
 O livro dos provérbios- 2º volume, 2005
 Histórias Tradicionais Recontadas Por António Mota, 2005
 De Barcelos Sei Um Saco De Cantigas, 2006, C.M.Barcelos
 O coelho branco, 2006
 A viagem do espanholito, 2006
 Outros tempos, 2006
 O livro das lengalengas 1, 2007
 Se tu visses o que eu vi, 2007
 Os  negócios do macaco, 2007
 O livro das lengalengas 2, 2008
 O pombo-correio, 2007
 Ninguém perguntou por mim, 2008
 Lá de cima cá de baixo, 2008
 João mandrião, 2008
 Lamas de Olo, Avenida da europa, 2008
 A rosa e o rapaz do violino, 2009
 A prenda com rodas, 2009
 Histórias da pedrinha do sol, 2009
 A Tenente-Coronel José Agostinho
 A praia dos sonhos, 2010,
 Pinguim, 2010
 A melhor condutora do mundo, 2010,
 Max e Achebiche uma história muito fixe, 2010
 Um cavalo no hipermercado, 2011
 O livro dos trava-línguas 2, 2011
 O primeiro dia de escola, 2011
 Os segredos dos dragões, 2011
 O anel mágico, 2011
 Histórias às cores, 2012
 A arca do avô Noé, 2014
 Maíto, 2014
 O caderno de JB encontrado em Lousada, 2015
 Dicionário das palavras sonhadoras, 2015
 Onde está a minha mãe?, 2016
 A casa da janela azul, 2017
 O gato e a Orquídea, 2018
Quando o regato secou, 2018

Footnotes

Living people
1957 births
People from Baião, Portugal
Portuguese children's writers
20th-century Portuguese writers
21st-century Portuguese writers